SMAK is a popular and one of the largest beverage, natural fruit juice, fruit preserves, snack and dairy products brand in Sri Lanka. The brand is owned by Country Style Foods Private Limited and was established in 1981. The company holds over 70% market share in non-carbonated beverages category in Sri Lanka.

History
Country Style Foods Private Limited was established on 5 February 1981 by three brothers (Daya Kumanayake, Dharmasiri Alahakoon and Sarath Alahakoon) with ten employees in Kadawatha. The company started producing natural fruit juices and jams under the brand name "SMAK". By late 1990s, the company started exporting its products to Australia, Canada, England, Germany, Italy, Middle East and to New Zealand. By 2010, the company started producing Mineral water, snacks and Dairy products under the same brand name.

Products
Country Style Foods Private Limited produces natural fruit juices, fruit preserves, mineral water, snacks and dairy products under the brand name SMAK. Drinks are produced from 100% local fresh fruits and dairy without the use of any artificial colour or flavours. The fruit juices and nectar are sold in PET bottles, Tetra Paks & glass bottles.

Juices & Nectar

The company produces drinks in the following flavours;

Ambarella
Chocolate
Coffee
Iramusu
Lime
Mandarin & Papaya
Mango
Mixed fruit
Pineapple
Soursop
Tamarind
Wood apple

Snack
Cassava Chips
Cheese and Onion Bite
Deviled Chickpea
Fried dal
Garlic mixed bite
Hot and spicy mixture
Indian Mixed Bite
Onion mixed bite
Spicy bite

Certifications
The company has been accorded ISO 22000, HACCP and Good Manufacturing Practices certifications by the Sri Lanka Standards Institution for its brand SMAK. In 1993, SMAK production process was used as the benchmark by Sri Lanka Standards Institution and industry standards were defined.

See also
List of companies of Sri Lanka

References 

1981 establishments in Sri Lanka
Food and drink companies of Sri Lanka
Food and drink companies established in 1981
Sri Lankan brands